Sigma Alpha Omega is an American non-denominational Christian sorority for women, founded at North Carolina State University on January 5, 1998. However, they can trace their roots back to the once co-educational Chi Alpha Omega fraternity founded at East Carolina University in 1987.  The sorority was formed after a vote of active members at the NCSU chapter in 1998 and focuses on setting good moral examples for their peers and their community.

History

Sigma Alpha Omega was formed as a sister sorority to Chi Alpha Omega, a Christian Fraternity. Founded in 1987 at East Carolina University, Chi Alpha Omega later established a little sister program to include their sisters in Christ. Soon after, the fraternity changed fully to co-ed.

In January 1998, the active brothers (both males and females) of the Beta chapter of Chi Alpha Omega at North Carolina State University voted to form Sigma Alpha Omega. Both groups are committed to living according to the ideals of Christ, uplifting each other through fellowship and service, and bringing the love of Christ to North Carolina State University. The founding sisters of Sigma Alpha Omega were Michelle Bull, Kathryn Meyer, Kimberly Rogers, and Josie Watson.

As the sorority grew, sisters of the Alpha chapter worked for three years to prepare documents to support a National Board of Trustees. In the spring of 2004, active and alumnae members of the Alpha chapter met and established a national board. The first National Board of Trustees consisted of alumnae members from the Alpha chapter.

Sigma Alpha Omega Christian Sorority, Inc was officially recognized as a national non-profit organization in North Carolina in June 2004. It was granted tax-exempt status by the IRS in 2014. The sorority's national headquarters is in Germantown, Tennessee.

Symbols 
Sigma Alpha Omega's colors are burgundy and forest green. The official shield and crest was designed by SAO's Alpha chapter alumna and former Trustee, Natasha Smith. It incorporates the Armor of God, the official colors, motto, founding year, and mascots. Its mascot is the dove and its flower is the lily. The sorority's official namesake Bible verses are:

 "I am the Alpha and the Omega, the First and the Last, the Beginning and the End." Revelation 22:13
 "My soul glorifies the Lord and my spirit rejoices in God my Savior." Luke 1:46-47

Philanthropy 

On June 2, 2007, at the annual National Convention, the current sisters of Sigma Alpha Omega recognized a need to have a unified philanthropic focus among all chapters to have a greater impact. The sisters voted to adopt ovarian cancer awareness as their national philanthropy after learning of the need for awareness about this type of cancer. The individual chapters of Sigma Alpha Omega focus on awareness and education about ovarian cancer through physical and financial support.

In 2013 Sisters by Grace, Sigma Alpha Omega's affiliated non-profit organization was founded to support sisters of Sigma Alpha Omega by providing funds and opportunities for sister development in academics, leadership, spiritual growth, and mission work. All of these activities aim to build not only sisters' relationship with each other, their families, and friends but most importantly, their relationship with Christ.

Chapters
Sigma Alpha Omega has 34 active chapters across twelve states. Active chapters are indicated in bold. Inactive chapters are indicated in italic.

Notes

Alumnae associations 
The sorority has three alumnae groups: the Midwest Alumnae Association, National Alumnae Association, and the Southwest Alumnae Association.

References

Christian fraternities and sororities in the United States
Student organizations established in 1998
1998 establishments in North Carolina
North Carolina State University